Tipulinae is a subfamily of crane flies. It contains the typical crane flies from the genus Tipula.

Genera

Acracantha Skuse, 1890
Angarotipula Savchenko, 1961
Austrotipula Alexander, 1920
Brachypremna Osten Sacken, 1887
Brithura Edwards, 1916
Clytocosmus Skuse, 1890
Elnoretta Alexander, 1929
Euvaldiviana Alexander, 1981
Goniotipula Alexander, 1921
Holorusia Loew, 1863
Hovapeza Alexander, 1951
Hovatipula Alexander, 1955
Idiotipula Alexander, 1921
Indotipula Edwards, 1931
Ischnotoma Skuse, 1890
Keiseromyia Alexander, 1963
Leptotarsus Guerin-Meneville, 1831
Macgregoromyia Alexander, 1929
Megistocera Wiedemann, 1828
Nephrotoma Meigen, 1803
Nigrotipula Hudson & Vane-Wright, 1969
Ozodicera Macquart, 1834
Platyphasia Skuse, 1890
Prionocera Loew, 1844
Prionota van der Wulp, 1885
Ptilogyna Westwood, 1835
Scamboneura Osten Sacken, 1882
Sphaerionotus de Meijere, 1919
Tipula Linnaeus, 1758
Tipulodina Enderlein, 1912
Valdiviana Alexander, 1929
Zelandotipula Alexander, 1922

References

Tipulidae
Nematocera subfamilies